XHCSV-FM 93.1/XECSV-AM 1000 is a combo radio station in Coatzacoalcos, Veracruz, Mexico. It is known as Máxima and carries an adult contemporary format.

History
The concession for 1000 AM was awarded in 1988. The FM station was added in 1994.

The tower used by the FM in the Benito Juárez Norte area of Coatzacoalcos failed in high winds on February 4, 2022.

References

Radio stations in Veracruz
Radio stations established in 1988